George Louis McGhee (March 3, 1925 – December 20, 2000) was a marriage and family therapist, one of the founders, originators, and first president of the California Association of Marriage and Family Therapists. He was also a lobbyist for marriage and family therapy laws in the state of California. Many states have patterned their laws regarding marriage and family therapy after California, this makes McGhee one of the founders and key influences in the field. The laws he helped pass and the organization he founded have done much to legitimize the profession in the United States.

Life
Born in Los Angeles, California, he joined the United States Navy in 1942. McGhee was honorably discharged as an aircraft radioman third class in 1945. He earned his associate degree in art from Los Angeles City College in 1949. McGhee earned his Bachelor of Arts degree from Los Angeles State College in 1951. He worked as a teacher for the Los Angeles Unified School District while earning a Master of Science in education and Counseling and Guidance (1958) at the University of Southern California. His dissertation "The Gifted Child" attempted to identify and classify gifted children.

In 1963, he received an honorary doctorate extramurally from the International Free Protestant Episcopal University (UK) in Clinical Psychology for his work in Marriage, Family, and Child Counseling and gifted children. He also received an honorary fellowship from Saint Andrew's Ecumenical Church Foundation (UK).

In 1963 he successfully lobbied the state legislature to pass a comprehensive bill (AB 2374) that established the first law governing the practice of Marriage and family therapy in the State of California. In 1964 he became one of the founders, originators, and first president of the California Association of Marriage and Family Therapists (currently over 30,000 members). In 1979 he earned his doctorate in leadership and human behavior from United States International University in San Diego.

He practiced Family Therapy and Human Behavioral psychology in Arizona, California, New Mexico, Texas, and with the United States Government.

He was in private practice as a marriage and family therapist (1964 to 2000). He had a massive stroke at his second home in Tennessee in early November, 2000. He died due to complications arising from the stroke on December 20, 2000, at the VA hospital in Loma Linda, California.

See also

References

Graham, A. Lee, (1993) Hemet News (Newspaper), currently The Press Enterprise (Newspaper), front-page article about George L. McGhee page A1, Citizen of the week, May 7, 1993. Hemet, CA.
Staff writer (2000) Hemet News (Newspaper), currently The Press Enterprise (Newspaper), obituary section article, Obituary on George L. McGhee, December 23, 2000. Hemet, CA.
Bamberg-Johnson, D. (1994) Las Cruces Sun-News, page A9 Family therapy center of N.M. denies no one service, August 15, 1994. Las Cruces, NM.
Bamberg-Johnson, D. (1994) Las Cruces Sun-News, Counseling made available to all, May 1994, Las Cruces, NM.
Staff writer (1942) Los Angeles Times (Newspaper), front-page article about George L. McGhee, page A6, (photo page B) Navy Recruits 10,000th Man Here Since Pearl Harbor, March 13, 1942.  Los Angeles, CA.

American psychotherapists
Relationship counseling
United States Navy sailors
United States Navy personnel of World War II
1925 births
2000 deaths
Los Angeles City College alumni
California State University, Los Angeles alumni
USC Rossier School of Education alumni
People from Los Angeles
United States International University alumni